Black Power Flower is the tenth solo album from stoner rock musician Brant Bjork. The album is the first credited to his solo band, the Low Desert Punk Band, and the first released on the Napalm Records label.

Music videos were made for the songs "Boogie Woogie on Your Brain" and "Controllers Destroyed".

Track listing

Personnel
Brant Bjork – vocals, guitar, producer 
Dave Dinsmore – bass  
Tony Tornay – drums
Bubba Dupree – guitar

Credits
Artwork design by Alexander von Wieding
Mastered by Gene Grimaldi
Recorded by Harper Hug & Trevor Whatever
Mixed by Brant Bjork, Harper Hug & Trevor Whatever

References

Brant Bjork albums
Napalm Records albums
2014 albums